Kurt Dietmar Richter (24 September 1931 − 15 January 2019) was a German composer and conductor.

Life 
Richter was born on September 24, 1931 in Plzeň (Czechoslovakia). His father was Gymnasium professor. At the urging of his mother he attended a music school, where he was appointed assistant concertmaster at the age of twelve. After the war his family moved from Sudetenland to Erfurt.

Musical career 
Richter was a member of the Thuringian Boys Choir in his childhood. From 1946 to 1949 he attended the Landesschule Pforta. He studied with Dieter Zechlin and Franz Jung at the Thuringian State Conservatory in Erfurt. Inspired by his Erfurt music teacher, he was fascinated among others by Paul Hindemith and the New Music. In 1990 he founded the Berlin artist initiative die neue brücke. His works have been performed among others at the Schauspielhaus Berlin, the Theater Greifswald and the Konzerthaus Berlin.

Richter died in Berlin at the age of 87.

Awards 
 1948: a-cappella choir prize of the Landesschule Pforta
 1977: 4th Prize at the International TV Opera Competition Salzburg/UNESCO
 1980: Carl Maria von Weber Prize of the city of Dresden
 1982: Carl Maria von Weber Prize of the city of Dresden
 1984: Hanns Eisler Prize
 1993: Paul Woitschach Prize
 1995: Württemberg Composition Prize
 1996: Saarlouis Composition Prize
 1999: Composition Prize of the 
 2000: Spanish a-cappella choir prize
 2001: Composition Prize of the 
 2003: Composition Prize of the State of Brandenburg
 2004: Friedrich Silcher Composition Prize Württemberg
 2005: Prize at the composition competition of the Humanistischer Verband Deutschlands

Compositions 
 1962 Jugendoper Der fahrende Schüler
 1964 Opera Pazifik
 1970 Sekundenoper
 1977 TV-Opera Bewährung über den Wolken (Deutscher Fernsehfunk)
 1978 Opera Der verlegene Magistrat
 1982 Opera Die Geschichte von Liebe und Salz
 1984 Mini-Opera Marx spielte gern Schach
 1985 Opera Adam und Eva

Radio play music 
 1990: Lev Lunts: Die Stadt der Gerechtigkeit – Director: Peter Groeger (Hörspiel – Funkhaus Berlin)

References

External links 
 
 Website of Kurt Dietmar Richter
 Kurt Dietmar Richter at 
 Kurt Dietmar Richter at Verlag Dohr
 

German conductors (music)
20th-century classical composers
1931 births
2019 deaths
Musicians from Plzeň
German Bohemian people